John Ewbank may refer to:
John Ewbank (composer), British-born Dutch composer, lyricist and record producer
John Ewbank (climber), Australian rock climber
John Wilson Ewbank, English painter

See also
John Eubank, baseball pitcher
John Eubanks (disambiguation)